Operation Speedy Express was a controversial U.S. Army 9th U.S. Infantry Division operation of the Vietnam War conducted in the Mekong Delta provinces Kiến Hòa and Vĩnh Bình. The operation, led by Major General Julian J. Ewell, was part of US military pacification efforts against the Viet Cong (VC). The US military sought to interdict lines of VC communication and deny them the use of base areas. At least 5,000 to 7,000 casualties were reported to have been civilians.

Overview
In late 1968 the 1st Brigade, 9th U.S. Infantry Division operated in Định Tường Province, using night ambush tactics; the 2nd Brigade continued its mission with the Mobile Riverine Force. Although engagements in the operation were typically small, the 9th Infantry Division fought several sizeable engagements. The objective was summarized by a U.S. Army publication to take the "war to the enemy in the Delta and sever his supply lines from Cambodia".

The U.S. military used 8,000 infantrymen, 50 artillery pieces, 50 helicopters and extensive aerial bombardment. The United States Air Force (USAF) used fighter bombers to carry out 3,381 tactical air strikes. The military also employed "people-sniffer" devices that detected traces of carbon and ammonia.

Operation
The operation commenced on 1 December 1968 but was only formally announced on 2 March 1969.

February
During the 25 minute battle, 16 enemy soldiers were killed (11 killed by air). There were no U.S. casualties.

The area was illuminated and the gunships attacked the sampans. The enemy returned fire with small arms and automatic weapons and the action continued into the night with USAF AC-47 Spooky gunships also engaging the enemy. The bodies of 24 PAVN/VC were observed lying in the strike area and five sampans were destroyed. There were no U.S. casualties.

The gunships attacked the sampans with machine guns and rockets and they returned fire with small arms and automatic weapons. Civilian Irregular Defense Group program (CIDG) troops were landed in the area and made contact with an enemy force and the action continued until 15:50 when the enemy withdrew leaving 38 dead and five sampans destroyed. There were no U.S. or CIDG casualties.

At about 18:00 the sampans were attacked by helicopter gunships and the enemy returned fire with small arms and automatic weapons. The action continued until 19:30 when the enemy withdrew leaving 16 dead and 21 sampans destroyed. Helicopter gunships provided support and all four sampans were destroyed and ten PAVN/VC killed for no U.S. losses. On 19 February helicopters from the 164th Combat Aviation Group (164th CAG) operating over Bạc Liêu Province attacked scattered groups of PAVN/VC killing nine, destroying 70 structures and 14 sampans and capturing seven individual weapons.

The PAVN/VC returned fire and the action continued until 21:30 when the PAVN/VC withdrew leaving 36 killed for no U.S. casualties.

March

At 12:55 1st Brigade infantry engaged an estimated VC battalion 9 miles northwest of Cai Lậy. Other 1st Brigade troops were landed in the area and helicopter gunships and airstrikes were conducted throughout the day and night. The VC withdrew before dawn leaving 57 dead and eight individual weapons, U.S. losses were one killed. A UH-1 was shot down during the action and crash-landed.

The VC withdrew after two hours leaving 17 dead while U.S. losses were two dead.

A further 20 were killed in later scattered contacts. Later that day helicopter gunships killed a further 18 PAVN/VC. At 20:25 another PAVN/VC force was engaged in the same area resulting in 14 killed.

The VC withdrew after an hour leaving 34 dead and one captured and four individual weapons, U.S. losses were two killed. At 15:00 in the same general area a 1st Brigade unit engaged two PAVN/VC companies, the action continued until 22:30 with helicopter gunships and tactical fighter providing support. The PAVN/VC lost 77 killed, 11 individual and nine crew-served weapons and three radios, U.S. losses were two killed.

The engagement continued until 16:15 when the PAVN/VC withdrew leaving 30 dead and ten individual weapons.

May

Further contacts later that day killed a further 21 PAVN/VC and captured six individual weapons, U.S. losses were one killed.

Twelve secondary explosions were observed and 21 PAVN/VC killed. The action continued until 23:10 and the bodies of 101 PAVN/VC dead and 21 individual weapons were found. The fighting continued until 17:10, 22 PAVN/VC and six U.S. were killed. The PAVN/VC withdrew by 18:20 leaving 92 dead.

The operation concluded on 31 May.

Aftermath
The U.S. Army claimed 10,899 PAVN/VC dead and 2,579 suspects detained, while 242 U.S. soldiers were killed and 2,385 wounded (a kill ratio of 45:1) and 688 individual and 60 crew-served weapons recovered (a ratio of enemy killed to weapons seized of 14.6:1).

According to Le Quan Cong, a VC platoon commander operating in the Delta during the operation, "most of the people killed were civilians, because civilians would run, we soldiers held our fighting position so they could not get us, they had wiped out whole villages" while failing to actually interdict the VC in the region. The VC claimed a strategic victory, claiming that their fighters and bases were left mostly intact and their presence in the region was not removed by the operation.

Controversy 
In December 1969 in the aftermath of the revelation of the My Lai massacre, stories began to appear in the press that atrocities by Americans and their allies were far more commonplace in South Vietnam than the U.S. government was willing to admit. Robert Kaylor of United Press International alleged that according to American pacification advisers in the Mekong Delta during the operation the division had indulged in the "wanton killing" of civilians through the "indiscriminate use of mass firepower. Ewell refuted the report, describing it to COMUSMACV General Creighton Abrams as "the biggest collection of malicious innuendo I have ever seen."

In June 1972, Newsweeks Saigon Bureau Chief, Kevin Buckley working with Alexander Shimkin, wrote an article titled "Pacification's Deadly Price" that questioned the spectacular ratio of U.S. dead to purported VC, as well the small number of weapons recovered, and suggested that perhaps more than 5,000 of the dead were innocent civilians (quoting an unnamed U.S. official). Buckley's statements were based on extensive interviews conducted by him and his associate Alexander D. Shimkin, who was fluent in Vietnamese. Although Buckley acknowledged that VC infrastructure and control in the region was extensive, he wrote that local hospitals had treated more wounds caused by U.S. firepower than by the VC. Bến Tre provincial hospital in Kien Hoa, treated 1,882 civilians with war related injuries during the operation. 76% (1,431) of them were injured by American fire power while 451 were wounded by VC fire.

In response to the issues raised by the Newsweek story, the Chief of MACV Information at the time, Colonel Phillip H. Stevens, observed that MACV investigators had attributed the low number of weapons captured to the nature of the terrain and the tactics Ewell had used. In the delta it was easy for the enemy to dispose of weapons by dropping them in canals, streams and paddies. A high percentage of casualties had also been inflicted at night or by aviation units, making the retrieval of weapons almost impossible. "In some heavily booby trapped areas, the number of weapons which might have been captured would not have justified the number of casualties that probably would have been sustained to locate them." On top of that, Stevens said, many members of guerrilla units in the region were unequipped with individual firearms.

The US Army Inspector General estimated that there were 5,000 to 7,000 civilian casualties from the operation.

Ewell, was allegedly known to be obsessed with body counts and favorable kill ratios and said "the hearts and minds approach can be overdone....in the delta the only way to overcome VC control and terror is with brute force applied against the VC". David Hackworth was a battalion commander during Speedy Express; according to him, "a lot of innocent Vietnamese civilians got slaughtered because of the Ewell-Hunt drive to have the highest count in the land." Hackworth added that "the 9th Division had the lowest weapons-captured-to-enemy-killed ratio in Vietnam." According to Hackworth, Ewell's policies would later earn him the nickname the "Butcher of the Delta" from members of the 9th Division. Nick Turse in his book Kill Anything That Moves asserts that "free fire zones", where any human present could be killed, helped the 9th Division achieve an unlikely enemy-to-GI kill ratio of 134:1 in April 1969. It has also been asserted that the operation targeted "people running, people in black pajamas, civilians past night-time". Furthermore, commanders and infantry units were forced into the field, and they were told they were not to leave until an acceptable number of "kills" were made. Robert G. Gard Jr., who served as artillery commander under Ewell and commenting on his superior officer stated "the idea that we killed only enemy combatants is about as gross an exaggeration as I could imagine, but to talk about ratios of forty-five to one simply defies my imagination."

More recently, former Senator (and eventual Secretary of Defense) Charles Hagel of Nebraska, a veteran of the 9th Infantry, alleged that some U.S. commanders on the ground inflated the body count during the operation since this was how their success was judged."You used that body count, commanding officers did, as the metric and measurement of how successful you were...."

See also 
 Human Rights Record of the United States
 My Lai massacre
 Pentagon Papers
 Phoenix Program
 Russell Tribunal
 Tiger Force
 United States war crimes
 Vietnam War Crimes Working Group
 Winter Soldier Investigation

References 

1968 in Vietnam
1969 in Vietnam
Speedy Express
Speedy Express
Speedy Express
Vietnam War casualties
Battles and operations of the Vietnam War in 1968
Battles and operations of the Vietnam War in 1969
History of Bến Tre Province
History of Tiền Giang Province
History of Trà Vinh Province